Jorrit Kunst (born 11 May 1989) is a Dutch former footballer who played as a defender. He formerly played professionally for FC Groningen and FC Emmen.

References

1989 births
Living people
Dutch footballers
FC Groningen players
FC Emmen players
Eredivisie players
Eerste Divisie players
Tweede Divisie players
Derde Divisie players
People from Eemsmond
WKE players
IJsselmeervogels players

Association football fullbacks
Footballers from Groningen (province)